Diana Kačanova (born 7 January 1993) is a Lithuanian race walker, who internationally competes for Lithuania. At 2010 in Moscow she reached her personal 5000 m walking record - 23:29.6.

She represented Lithuania in 2009 World Youth Championships in Athletics, where she reached 16th place. Kačanova also represented her country in 2010 Summer Youth Olympics.

Achievements

References

1993 births
Living people
Lithuanian female racewalkers
Athletes (track and field) at the 2010 Summer Youth Olympics